Pierre Bruno (born 28 June 1996) is an Italian professional rugby union player who primarily plays wing for Zebre Parma of the United Rugby Championship.

Professional career 
Bruno has previously played for clubs such as Mogliano and Calvisano in the past. For 2017–18 Pro14 season, he named as Additional Player for Zebre.

In 2015 and 2016, Bruno was named in the Italy Under 20 squad  and in 2017 and 2018 he was named in the Emerging Italy squad. On 8 November 2021 he was named in the Italy A squad for the 2021 end-of-year rugby union internationals.

On the 31 October 2021, he was selected by Kieran Crowley to be part of an Italy 34-man squad for the 2021 end-of-year rugby union internationals. He made his debut for Italy on 20 November 2021 against Uruguay, scoring a try in Italy's 17–10 win.

Kieran Crowley selected Pierre Bruno also for the 2022 Six Nations Championship, but his debut in the tournament against Ireland was unfortunate, as he had to be replaced after only 20 minutes due to a controversial refereeing decision. Bruno was also in the Italian starting team that faced Scotland in Rome. The match ended in another defeat for Italy (22-33), but with signs of improvement.

Bruno had the opportunity to make up for it in November 2022 Autumn internationals, when he scored two tries in the sparkling victory of Italy over Samoa (49-17), and another try against Australia, a first ever win for the Italian team facing the Wallabies (28-27).

Statistics

List of international test tries 
As of 25 February 2022

References

External links 

1996 births
Sportspeople from Genoa
Zebre Parma players
Living people
Rugby union wings
Mogliano Rugby players
Rugby Calvisano players
Italy international rugby union players